Chloe and Theo is a 2015 American independent drama film written and directed by Ezna Sands. The film stars Dakota Johnson, Mira Sorvino, and Theo Ikummaq.

The film was released in the United States on September 4, 2015, in a limited release, and through video on demand. It received negative reviews and has a rare approval rating of 0% on Rotten Tomatoes. This was the last film with Larry King as an actor before his death in January 2021.

Synopsis 
A young homeless woman from New York City named Chloe strikes up a friendship with an Arctic Inuit man named Theo who is looking for the Elders of the Southern world to save his people. Chloe joins him in his quest which takes viewers on a journey of heart and humor.

Cast

Release 
On October 29, 2014, it was announced Spotlight Pictures had acquired worldwide sales to the film. On May 12, 2015, it was announced Tiberus Film would release the film in Germany. The film was scheduled to be released in Germany on October 1, 2015. The film was released in the United Kingdom on June 26, 2015 through video on demand, and in the United States on September 4, 2015 in a limited release and through video on demand.

Critical reception 
On Rotten Tomatoes the has a rare approval rating of 0%, based on 17 reviews, with an average rating of 2.9/10. On Metacritic, the film has a score of 24 out of 100, based on nine critics, indicating "generally unfavorable reviews".

Frank Scheck of The Hollywood Reporter gave the film a negative review, writing, "Ikummaq displays a quiet dignity in his understated performance, even as his character is often reduced to being the butt of silly jokes. But Johnson squanders whatever good will she earned from 50 Shades of Grey, looking apple-pie wholesome as a homeless ex-junkie whose squalid state is suggested only by artful smudges on her cheeks." Garry Garrison of Indiewire also gave the film a D, writing, "The hope left then, is that the intentions were pure. Surely, at some point 'Chloe And Theo' had substance and depth and made a bit more narrative sense (the thing appears to have been hacked from 112 minutes down to a brief 81 minute runtime complete with two voiceovers), but the result here is painful. 'Chloe And Theo' should have been a film about Theo: a complex man taking on an unfamiliar world he is not particularly fond of, with little more than conviction and principle to help him along. Instead, we get another film where a hapless foreigner teaches white people how to better themselves."

References

External links 
 

American independent films
Films scored by the Newton Brothers
2010s English-language films
2010s American films